William Henry Ellison  (November 1, 1945 – March 11, 2019) was an American football running back who played eight seasons in the National Football League for the Los Angeles Rams and the Kansas City Chiefs. Sporting #33, he spent his first four seasons in the NFL as backup behind Larry Smith, before taking over as starting tailback in 1971. On December 5, 1971 against the New Orleans Saints he rushed 26 times for 247 yards thus breaking Cookie Gilchrist's pro football record of 243 yards. The NFL record at the time was held by Jim Brown, who ran 237 against the Los Angeles Rams in 1957. Ellison was subsequently named NFL Offensive Player of the Week by the Associated Press. Ellison went on to the Pro Bowl after the 1971 NFL season. He played college football at Texas Southern. He lived in Pearland, TX working as a substitute teacher in the Pearland ISD area.

Ellison died on March 11, 2019.

References

1945 births
2019 deaths
People from Lockhart, Texas
Players of American football from Texas
American football running backs
Texas Southern Tigers football players
Los Angeles Rams players
Kansas City Chiefs players
National Conference Pro Bowl players